Nick Campbell is a Scottish boxer and current Scottish Heavyweight Champion. He is also a former Scotland Club XV international rugby union player. He played rugby union for the Glasgow Warriors and the Jersey Reds.

Rugby Union career

Amateur career

The position he primarily played is lock.

He played for Allan Glen's and then Cartha Queens Park before moving to Glasgow Hawks in 2008.

He played for Glasgow Hawks for two years before signing for the Warriors in 2010.

Professional career

He made his Glasgow Warriors debut in 2011. He has the Glasgow Warrior No. 197

He scored his first try for Glasgow Warriors in their historic victory over Leinster at the RDS Arena.

International career

He represented Scotland U20 in Japan, in the Under 20 World Cup.

He played for Scotland Club XV. He played against the Ireland Club XV side in 2011.

Boxing career

Appropriately given his rugby union career, his boxing nickname is "The Glasgow Warrior". Campbell's grandfather was a professional boxer.

He made his boxing debut as a heavyweight on the undercard of Conor Benn versus Samuel Vargas securing victory in the second round of a scheduled six. After already putting his opponent Petr Frohlich on the canvas, he followed up with sustained pressure leading the referee to stop the fight.

Scottish Heavyweight Champion

He won the Scottish Heavyweight Championship on 26 February 2022, beating Jay McFarlane in seven rounds; at the Hydro in Glasgow. He had sparred with former New Zealand rugby union international player and now boxer, Sonny Bill Williams in the lead up to the fight.

Before the Campbell - McFarlane bout, the Scottish Heavyweight Championship was last contested between George Stern and Hugh McDonald on 22 June 1951; at the Recreation Ground in Alloa. Stern won that match. In the run-up to the fight Stern's family got in touch with Campbell - and he explained: "They are mad Glasgow Warrior supporters! His daughter got in touch and asked if I'd be up for meeting him after the fight if I win, because they had seen me play for the Warriors at Scotstoun."

References

See also 
 List of Scottish rugby union players
 Rugby union in Scotland

1989 births
Living people
Scottish rugby union players
Rugby union players from Glasgow
Glasgow Warriors players
Scotland Club XV international rugby union players
Scottish male boxers
Allan Glen's RFC players
Cartha Queens Park RFC players
Glasgow Hawks players
Rugby union locks